Aldwick is a seaside civil parish in the Arun district of West Sussex, England, which contains part of the suburbs of Bognor Regis to the East. The ecclesiastical parish, formerly part of Pagham includes the smaller settlement of Rose Green.

There are three churches, a few shops and several miles of beach.

History
Aldwick was formerly part of the older Pagham parish and formerly an important tithing, giving its name to a hundred. It was part of the ancient Rape of Chichester.

20th century
Aldwick had, briefly, a home of the constitutional monarch of the British Empire when King George V convalesced (with his wider family regularly visiting) at Craigweil House in 1929, before its demolition. This stay led directly to Bognor attaining the suffix 'Regis'.  The area around this has throwback relatively ornate architecture of the early 20th century and a large conservation area.

Amenities
Avisford Park in Rose Green has a large field that has a play area, basketball court and seating area as well as a sports pavilion for football matches.  In 1988 there were plans to build a large Co-op on this field, but due to strong opposition the plan was dropped. Four houses were built on a minority of the formerly larger site.
Aldwick has a convenience store on Nyetimber Lane, which became in the early 21st century a Co-op Food store, having been refurbished from a smaller outlet.

Churches
Aldwick has three churches: Anglican, dedicated to St Richard of Chichester, built in 1933 (a former iron church existed); Roman Catholic dedicated to St Anthony of Viareggio; Free Church (Baptist).

Landmarks
A blue cedar Cedrus atlantica (glauca) was planted by Queen Mary in 1929.

Notable residents
Duff Cooper, Viscount Norwich
Countess Newburgh had constructed the royal retreat as her own home known as The Pavilion in 1806 (demolished in 1939).
Sir Arthur Du Cros founded the Dunlop Rubber Company and became director of the Austin Motor Company.  Seawater was pumped to every bathroom; and an electric lift served the three floors, an electric organ was installed (with music piped around the house), and a telephone system to every bedroom.  Sir Arthur Du Cros was an influential member of parliament also; two Prime Ministers - Bonar Law and Asquith enjoyed his hospitality at Craigweil House.
Lord Bernstein of Craigweil, one time head of Granada Television, lived at "Five Trees", 78 The Drive, until the 1970s and is thought to have taken the title from Craigweil when he was elevated to the peerage.  He received a Life Peerage in 2006 as a Socialist Peer.  The House was sold by Lord Bernstein circa 1985.
The Cater family, founders of a large grocery lived at "Silvergates", 52 The Drive.
Rita Hayworth, actress, regularly visited "Kingswood", 62 The Drive accompanied by Ali Khan, the son of the Aga Khan.
John Snagge, the wartime broadcaster, lived at "Little Fellows" during the wartime years that Du Cros' daughter was away.  He famously broadcast the landing on the beaches at D-Day and was a contemporary of Alvar Liddel and Stuart Hibberd.
Sir Maurice Jenks was Du Cros' son-in-law and lived at Little Fellows and was Lord Mayor of London in 1931.
The last survivor of the Farndon family who founded store Dorothy Perkins, Mrs. Matti Farndon died in October 1995 having lived at the family home here " Kings Lawn", 38 Kingsway.
Sir Ronald Howe, then the recently retired Assistant Commissioner in charge of the Metropolitan Police Criminal Investigation Branch, lived at "Queenslawn" 36 Kingsway, in which grounds grows the tree planted by Queen Mary.
The Marchioness of Cambridge had "Three Ways" built at Canons Close, for her occasional use.

References

External links

Aldwick Local Businesses and Attractions
Aldwick Parish Council website
Aldwick Preservation Society

Civil parishes in West Sussex
Villages in West Sussex
Arun District
Populated coastal places in West Sussex
Beaches of West Sussex